Coupler may refer to:

Engineering

Mechanical
 Railway coupler, a mechanism for connecting rolling stock in a train device
 Janney coupler
 SA3 coupler
 Scharfenberg coupler for multiple unit passenger cars
 Quick coupler, used in construction machines to allow the rapid change of buckets
 Coupling, a device used to connect two shafts together at their ends for the purpose of transmitting power
 Universal coupling, a joint or coupling in a rigid rod that allows the rod to 'bend' in any direction

Electronics
 Acoustic coupler, for coupling electrical signals by acoustical means
 Directional coupler, a passive device used in radio technology
 Antenna coupler, a device connected between a radio transmitter or receiver and its antenna
 Output coupler, a partially reflective mirror used in lasers

Other uses
 Coupler (piping), also called a (joist) short length of pipe with two female threads
 Coupler, a device used on a pipe organ or harpsichord to allow a player to play multiple divisions at once, by means of "coupling" a division to another at either sub, super, or octave pitches
 Coupler, a tap valve, for controlling the release of beer out of a keg
 Coupler, the floating link in a four-bar linkage
 Hydrant coupler, for aircraft fueling equipment

See also
 Coupling (disambiguation)
 Decoupling (disambiguation)